Bannwil railway station (Bahnhof Bannwil) is a railway station on the metre-gauge line Langenthal–Oensingen at Bannwil, canton of Bern, Switzerland. It was opened in 1907 by the Langenthal-Jura-Bahn. The line is currently operated by Aare Seeland mobil (ASM). The original station building with its goods shed is in the architectural inventory of the canton of Bern.

References

Gallery

External links
 

Railway stations in Switzerland opened in 1907
Railway stations in the canton of Aargau